The Fort Stamford Site, site of Fort Stamford, is a public park at 900 Westover Road in the Westover neighborhood of Stamford, Connecticut. It was listed on the National Register of Historic Places in 1975.  It is the site of the archaeological remnants of a military earthworks erected during the American Revolutionary War. The fort's location gave a clear view of the Mianus River and Long Island Sound.

History

American Revolution
During the Revolutionary War, Fort Stamford was created to aid in the defense of Connecticut from loyalist raids. The fort in its current form was designed by the engineer who constructed West Point, Rufus Putnam. General David Waterbury oversaw the construction in 1781. At its peak, the fort was home to 800 soldiers.

Some form of military camp or fortification existed at the site prior to the construction of the current fort. During the February 26, 1779 raid on Greenwich by William Tryon, General Israel Putnam rode to Fort Stamford to rally reinforcements. Troops from the fort successfully defended Stamford in a battle near Palmer's Hill and the Mianus River. On July 2, 1779 during Banastre Tarleton's raid on Pound Ridge, New York, the 2nd Regiment of Light Horse under Colonel Sheldon prevented the fort from being directly attacked.

Later in the war, roughly 300 men manned the fort. When the war ended, the fort was considered no longer necessary, and was promptly sold. In later years, residents of the neighborhood began referring to Fort Stamford as "Fort Nonsense."

As a Private Residence
The area encompassing Fort Stamford was a private residence known as Fortland Farm, owned for some time by the Ogden family.

In 1928, stockbroker Marcus Goodbody, founder of Goodbody & Co. moved his family to the property. His wife Virginia constructed the Italianate Garden that still stands on the property, now known as the Goodbody Garden.

Fort Stamford Park

The City of Stamford purchased 5-acre property in 1972 from the Goodbody family, and the park features some of their garden structures in the formal Goodbody Garden maintained by the Stamford Garden Club.

See also
National Register of Historic Places listings in Stamford, Connecticut

References

National Register of Historic Places in Fairfield County, Connecticut
History of Stamford, Connecticut
Parks in Fairfield County, Connecticut
Stamford
Stamford